The 2023 United Nations Climate Change Conference or Conference of the Parties of the UNFCCC, more commonly referred to as COP28, will be the 28th United Nations Climate Change conference, held from November 30th until December 12th, 2023 at the Expo City, Dubai. The conference has been held annually since the first UN climate agreement in 1992. It is used by governments to agree on policies to limit global temperature rises and adapt to impacts associated with climate change. In this decisive decade for climate action, the UAE will seek to unite the world towards agreement on bold, practical, and ambitious solutions to the most pressing global challenge of our time.

Background
In early 2021 the UAE offered to host the 2023 event,  and in November 2021 the prime minister of the United Arab Emirates, Sheikh Mohammed bin Rashid al-Maktoum announced that the UAE would be hosting the 2023 conference. It was the second time in two years that the conference was held in the Middle East, and the third time it was hosted by a member of OPEC after Qatar in 2012 and Indonesia in 2007.  The UAE pledged to reduce carbon emissions to net zero by 2050, the first middle eastern government to make such a pledge.  They were also the first country in the region to sign the Paris Agreement on September 21, 2016.   The country has invested $50 billion into clean energy internationally, and promised an additional $50 billion by 2030.  In November 2022, the UAE agreed to partner with the United States to invest another $100 billion in clean energy.

Global stocktake
Soon before the opening of COP28, the United Nations will publish the first two-year assessment of global progress to slow down climate change called the "global stocktake." The overview was established during COP26 in Glasgow and is scheduled to be repeated every five years.

Reception 
Sultan Al Jaber was named President-Designate of COP28 UAE back in January of 2023. He is the chairman and a founder of the UAE's renewable energy company [[Masdar]]; the country's climate envoy; the minister for industry and advanced technology; and the CEO of the Abu Dhabi National Oil Company. The appointment has been met with criticism from activists worried about al Jaber's conflict of interest, while others, involved in climate diplomacy, including American climate envoy John Kerry,  have welcomed it, recognizing al Jaber's experience with Masdar, and as a business leader and diplomat. On January 12, 2023 Kerry sent a congratulatory message to the UAE for selecting al Jaber. Frans Timmermans, EU climate chief, said Al Jaber was "ideally placed to help us move forward" in global climate talks. Agnès Pannier-Runacher, the French minister for the energy transition said "Sultan Al Jaber has strong political clout and a decarbonization strategy for his country" and added that "the UAE was one of the most advanced countries in the region, including on the climate front." Denmark's minister for Global climate policy, Dan Jørgensen said " I think that everything the Presidency has done so far has only given us reason to be optimistic." CEO and president of the Atlantic Council, Frederick Kempe said that criticism of Al Jaber's appointment overlooks his "rich background in both renewables and fossil fuels" which makes him "an ideal choice at a time when efforts to address climate change have been far too slow, lacking the inclusivity to produce more transformative results."

In January 2023, Dubai Cares became the Education partner for COP28. It had already participated in COP27 held in Sharm El-Sheikh, Egypt.

Al Jaber’s presidency of COP28 climate change conference contradicted his company’s decision to expand fossil fuel production in ADNOC Drilling company. The human rights organization, Amnesty International raised concerns, stating , “Sultan al-Jaber cannot be an honest broker for climate talks when the company he leads is planning to cause more climate damage.”

The Bloomberg editorial board disagreed stating that “Al Jaber is precisely the kind of ally the climate movement needs.” Citing the ways Al Jaber has lobbied for more involvement of the international community in the hard work of ameliorating the dangers of climate change, Bloomberg pointed out that not only does Al Jaber have an interest in the UAE’s oil sector, he has “a stake in the clean-energy interest, too.”

See also 

 Climate change in the United Arab Emirates
 2023 in climate change
 Global Assembly

References

External links
 COP28 Official Twitter Page
 COP28 Official Youtube Page
 COP28 Official Instagram Page
 COP28 Official LinkedIn Page
 COP28 Official Website
 UNFCCC web page about COP28

United Nations
2023 in the United Arab Emirates
2023 in international relations
2023 in the environment
November 2023 events in Africa
United Nations climate change conferences
Climate change controversies